Adamjee Government Science College (AGSC) is an educational institution in Karachi, Pakistan. 

It was established in 1961, by All Pakistan Memon Educational and Welfare Society through the financial help and efforts of late Sir Adamjee Haji Dawood and Mr. Abdul Ghani Dada Bhai Junani. It is located in the heart of the city, near the mausoleum of Quaid-e-Azam Muhammad Ali Jinnah (the father of Pakistan), in the area of Garden East (Jamshed Town) on Business Recorder Road, Karachi. The college is frequently rated as one of the best public college, and only the students securing high grades in matriculation are eligible for admission.

History
The inauguration ceremony was performed by the then President of Pakistan, Field Marshal General Ayub Khan, on 30 July 1961.

The college commenced with 100 students in class XI and every year a new class was added and up to 1965, it became a full-fledged degree science college, with more than two hundred students at Intermediate level and forty five students at degree level.

The college was nationalized on 1 September 1972. At that time there were 400 students in Intermediate and 100 students in Degree Classes. Since then, the enrollment has grown steadily, and at present there are over Thirteen Hundred Students in Intermediate and One Hundred in Degree classes. In fact the number of students has tripled since nationalization without much corresponding increase in physical facilities and number of academic and non-academic staff.

Principals
 Prof. A.L. Shaikh (30 April 1961 to 31 August 1972).
 Prof. Dr.Mastoor M.Tahir (1 September 1972 to 6 December 1986).
 Prof. Muhammad Amanullah ( 7 December 1986 to 8 October 1991).
 Prof. S.Iftikhar Ahmed (9 October 1991 to 10 March 1993).
 Prof. Dr. M. Faheemuddin (11 March 1993 to 11 February 1998).
 Prof. Muhammad Saeed Siddiqui (12 February 1998 to 15 October 1999).
 Prof. Dr. M.Sharif Memon (1 October 1999 to 2 December 1999).
 Prof. M.Saeed Siddiqui (3 December 1999 to 31 December 1999).
 Prof. Mumtaz Ali Abbasi (1 January 2000 to 22 March 2000).
 Prof. M.Jawaid Siddiqui (23 March 2000 to 18 September 2002).
 Prof. Syed Sadruddin Hussain (19 March 2002 to 18 March 2003).
 Prof. Salahuddin Jamali (19 March 2003 to 6 April 2004).
 Prof. S.Sadruddin Hussain (7 April 2004 to 25 April 2005).
 Prof. Kafeel Alam Siddiqui (26 April 2005 to 31 October 2005).
 Prof. Dr. Rafiq Ahmed Siddiqui (1 November 2005 to 24 April 2007).
 Prof. Dr. Nasir Ansar (25 April 2007 to 15 March 2010).
 Prof. Tariq Habib (16 March 2010 to 9 March 2011).
 Prof. Zafar Saeed Shaikh (10 March 2011 to 15 April 2011).
 Prof. A.B.Awan (15 April 2011 to 2013)
 Prof. Naseem Haider (10 August 2014 to 1 June 2017)
 Prof. Nasir Iqbal (2 June 2017 – 7 August 2017)
 Prof. Moazzam Haider (8 August 2017 – 2019)
 Prof. Mohsin Sheikh (2019 - 2021)
 Prof. Mushtaq Ahmed Maher (2021-2022)
 Prof.Hafiz Abdul Bari Indhar (2022-present)

Location
The college is located in Jamshed Town in the Garden East area near Gurumandir Roundabout, off Business Recorder Road on Shahani Street, Karachi.

See also
 Adamjee Group

References

Universities and colleges in Karachi